The Volvo Laplander L3314 is a range of military vehicles produced by Volvo.

In the early 1950s Volvo received an order to develop a new utility vehicle for the Swedish Army. A pre-run series of 90 vehicles, named the L2304, was delivered between 1959 and 1961. It was powered by a Volvo B16 engine. Full scale deliveries of the somewhat improved L3314 began in 1963. The L3314 was powered by the 1.8L B18.

The L33-series was offered with different body-variants such as hard-top, half-cab, soft-top, or special versions mounting anti-tank weapons. All vehicles are forward control (where the cab is located over the front axle), except the open L3304. The base version was the L3314SU softtop. Other versions were the L3314HT hardtop with mechanical winch, the L3304 anti-tank gun vehicle and the L3315 communications version, with a shielded 24V system. The L3314 was succeeded by the Volvo C303 in the late 1970s.

An upgraded version of the L3314 was offered on the civilian market in 1977 as the C202. It was a hard-top with the more powerful B20 engine instead of the B18, but with less robust axles and no differential brake. The C202 was manufactured in Hungary as a cheaper alternative to the more expensive C303. Civilian versions of the L3314 series, as well as the C202, are often called the Volvo "Laplander".

Military use

Sweden
The L3314SU was adopted by the Swedish Army in 1959 as the Personlastterrängbil 903 (Pltgb 903) and the L3314HT as the Pltgb 903B. The hard-top L3315 communications and command version was named the Radiopersonterrängbil 9033 (Raptgb 9033). (The L3315 was soon nicknamed Valp, meaning "puppy", from its clumsy looks.) The L3304 low profile open bodywork version was called the Pansarvärnspjästerrängbil 9031 (Pvpjtgb 9031) and armed with a Pvpj 1110 90 mm recoil-less antitank gun. The Swedish Army also used a few half-cabs, designated the Pansarvärnsrobotterrängbil 9032 (Pvrbtgb 9032) and fitted with a Bofors Bantam ATGM.
There were some deliveries of a version for fire fighting, called the Brandterrängbil 921. These could be connected to a trailer via a power take-off at the rear of the vehicle.

Norway
The Norwegian Army adopted a version called the L3314N with a fold-down windscreen and 24 volt electrical system to comply with NATO regulations. About 2,000 vehicles were purchased and assembled at Raufoss in Norway. In Norway the L3314 is commonly known as "Felt", meaning "field", from its Norwegian military designation: Vogn, felt, 1/2 tonn, 4x4, Volvo, modell L3314N.

Netherlands
The Royal Netherlands Army bought a special version able to ford extra deep water (compared to the standard 0.5 metre limit).

Saudi Arabia
Saudi Arabia took delivery of some 200 L3314N Öken (Desert), which was an adapted version of the Norwegian version, the L3314N. A curious fact is that these desert-bound vehicles retained the Norwegian ski-racks.

Civilian use
Both versions are employed by civilians for rescue services and private use. Many L3314s have been sold as military surplus and are used by off-road enthusiasts.

Technology
The Laplander used constant velocity joints, of the type invented by Alfred H. Rzeppa, in its front axle.

Data L3314

Engine
Engine: B 18 A
Fuel: leaded petrol
Power: 65 hp (DIN) at 4500 rpm
Volume: 1778 cc
Compression ratio: 8,5:1

Transmission
Gearbox: Modified Volvo M 40
Transfer case: ZF VG 50
Front axle: Salisbury 4HS-001-85
Rear axle: Salisbury 4HA-00-92 with POWR-LOK differential brake

Wheel
Rim: 6,50"×16"
Tyre: 8,90"×16, modern designation 280/85R16"

Data C 202

Engine
Engine: B 20 A
Configuration: inline 4-cylinder
Carburettor: 1 SU HIF-6
Fuel: leaded petrol 93 octane
Power: 82 hp
Volume: 1978 cc
Compression ratio: 8,7:1

Transmission
Gearbox: Volvo M 45
Transfer case: Volvo FD51 (part-time 4x4)
Front axle: Salisbury 4HS-001-294 B
Rear axle: Salisbury 4HA-001-293 B (without differential lock)

Other
Tyre:  285/80 R16
Top speed:  
Weight: Hard top , Pickup , Total (both)
Dimensions: length , width , height

Production
The L3314 and the L3315 were manufactured at Volvo's Lundby plant in Gothenburg.
L3314: 7737 
L3315: 1116 
L3304: 367 
C202: 3222

References

External links

Basic info about L3314. Archived. 
Detailed technical data for military series.

L-3314
Military trucks
Vehicles introduced in 1959
1959 establishments in Sweden
Cab over off-road vehicles
Military vehicles introduced in the 1950s